Lexy & K-Paul are DJs from Berlin consisting of Alexander Gerlach ("Lexy", born 14 January 1976 in Dresden) and Kai Michael Paul, formerly Kai Michael Fuchs ("K-Paul", born 5 November 1973 in Berlin). Lexy is also a member of the project Die Raketen, which also consists of Adel Dior and Jan-Eric Scholz. K-Paul formed duo Fuchs und Horn together with Horn.

Their music was released on Low Spirit Recordings, which is owned by WestBam, until 2007, when they formed their own label MusicIsMusic, distributed by Kontor Records.

Additional information

In 2001, Lexy, together with Mark Spoon, acted in the film Be.Angeled by Roman Kuhn. In 2005, The DVD was released showing the six-year-old band's history. It contains all their music videos with audio commentaries, a "making of" feature, and an exclusive interview.

Discography

Albums

Singles

DVDs 
 2005: Lexy & K-Paul – The DVD

Awards 
 2001 – ECHO „Best National Newcomer Dance Act 2001“

External links 
 
 Article at Laut.de
 Kontor Recordings
 Die Raketen – ein weiteres Projekt von Lexy
 Lexy & K-Paul at technoWIKI (German)
 
 
 
 [ Lexy & K-Paul] im AllMusic (English)

References

Club DJs
German DJs
German techno music groups
Electronic dance music duos
German musical duos